The women's 100 metres event at the 1989 Summer Universiade was held at the Wedaustadion in Duisburg with the final on 25 and 26 August 1989.

Medalists

Results

Heats
Wind:Heat 3: 0.0 m/s

Semifinals
Wind:Heat 1: -1.3 m/s, Heat 2: 0.0 m/s

Final

Wind: -1.4 m/s

References

Athletics at the 1989 Summer Universiade
1989